Min søsters børn (My Sister's Children) is a Danish film from 2001. It was directed by Tomas Villum Jensen, and the screenplay was written by Michael Asmussen and Søren Frellesen. The music for the film was composed by Jesper Winge Leisner and Jeppe Kaas.

Plot
The renowned pediatric psychologist Erik Lund, author of the book Barnlige børns bedrifter (Childish Child's Business), gets the opportunity to test his theories in practice because he must take care of his sister's five very lively children age three to sixteen. The children take the opportunity to get the family's house ready so it does not have to be sold.

Cast
 Peter Gantzler: Uncle Erik
 Wencke Barfoed: Mother
 Niels Olsen: Father
 Lotte Merete Andersen: Mrs. Flinth
 Asger Reher: Mr. Børgesen
 Lene Maria Christensen
 Laura Christensen
 Joachim Knop
 Jeppe Kaas
 Birthe Neumann: real estate agent
 Benedikte Maria Mouritsen: Pusle
 Michael Meyerheim: himself
 Fritz Bjerre Donatzsky-Hansen: Blop
 Neel Rønholt: Amalie
 Lasse Baunkilde: Frederik
 Stefan Pagels Andersen: Jan
 Mikkel Sundø: Michael
 Bubber: himself

Sequels
The film had two sequels, Min søsters børn i sneen (My Sister's Children in the Snow) in 2002 and Min søsters børn i Ægypten (My Sister's Children in Egypt) in 2004.

References

External links
Min søsters børn at IMDb

2001 comedy films
Danish comedy films
2000s Danish-language films